is a railway station on the Kominato Line in Ichihara, Chiba Prefecture, Japan, operated by the Kominato Railway.

Lines
Amaariki Station is served by the 39.1 km Kominato Line, and lies 5.4 km from the western terminus of the line at Goi Station.

Station layout
Amaariki Station has two opposed side platforms serving two tracks. The station building, which dates from 1925, is staffed.

Platforms

Adjacent stations

History
Amaariki Station opened on March 7, 1925.

Passenger statistics
In fiscal 2010, the station was used by an average of 215 passengers daily (boarding passengers only).

Bus routes

See also
 List of railway stations in Japan

References

External links

  

Railway stations in Japan opened in 1925
Railway stations in Chiba Prefecture